Miss Broadway is the first album of the female trio Belle Epoque, released in 1977. The album includes a disco version of Los Bravos' 1966 hit "Black Is Black".

The second side of the album is a disco medley, in which "Black Is Black" itself appears three times.

The title track was released as a single, reaching #92 in the United States and #11 in France.

Track listing as appears in record's sleeve

Side 1
 "Miss Broadway" (E. Lenton, A. Weyman) - 7:25
 "Me and You" (E. Lenton) - 5:30
 "Losing You" (E. Lenton, R. Conrado) - 4:15

Side 2
 a)"Disco Sound" (A. Weyman)  b)"Black Is Black" (M. Grainger, S. Waday, T. Hayes)  c)"Why Don't You Lay" (A. Weyman) - 14:15

Track listing as appears in record's label

Side 1
Same as the sleeve

Side 2
 "Black is Black / Disco Sound"
 "Black is Black"
 "Why Don't You Lay Down"
 "Black is Black"

Charts

References

1977 debut albums